Brownlow Henry George Cecil, 4th Marquess of Exeter  (20 December 1849 – 9 April 1898), styled Lord Burghley between 1867 and 1895, was a British peer and Conservative politician. He served as Vice-Chamberlain of the Household between 1891 and 1892.

Background
Exeter was the eldest son of William Cecil, 3rd Marquess of Exeter, and Lady Georgiana Sophia, daughter of Thomas Pakenham, 2nd Earl of Longford. Lord William Cecil and Lord John Joicey-Cecil were his younger brothers.

Political career

Exeter was elected to the House of Commons for Northamptonshire North in 1877, a seat he held until 1895, and served under his kinsman Lord Salisbury as Vice-Chamberlain of the Household from 1891 to 1892. In 1891 he was admitted to the Privy Council. He succeeded his father in the marquessate in 1895 and took his seat in the House of Lords.

Apart from his political career Lord Exeter was a Captain in the Grenadier Guards and Colonel in the 3rd and 4th Battalions of the Northamptonshire Regiment. He also served as a Deputy Lieutenant of Lincolnshire.

Family
Lord Exeter married Isabella, daughter of Sir Thomas Whichcote, 7th Baronet, in 1875. He died in April 1898, aged only 48, and was succeeded in his titles by his son and only child, William. The Marchioness of Exeter died in July 1917.

References

External links 
 

1849 births
1898 deaths
Barons Burghley
Brownlow, Exeter 4
Deputy Lieutenants of Lincolnshire
UK MPs 1874–1880
UK MPs 1880–1885
UK MPs 1885–1886
UK MPs 1886–1892
UK MPs 1892–1895
Exeter, M4
Members of the Parliament of the United Kingdom for English constituencies
Members of the Privy Council of the United Kingdom
4